Niccolò Beni (born 9 July 1986) is an Italian swimmer who competed in the 2008 Summer Olympics.

References

1986 births
Living people
Italian male swimmers
Italian male butterfly swimmers
Olympic swimmers of Italy
Swimmers at the 2008 Summer Olympics
Mediterranean Games bronze medalists for Italy
Mediterranean Games medalists in swimming
Swimmers at the 2009 Mediterranean Games
20th-century Italian people
21st-century Italian people